Frédéric Shtjefan Veseli (born 20 November 1992), also known as Freddie Veseli, is a professional footballer who plays as a defender for Italian  club Benevento and the Albania national team. His main position is centre back but he can also play at right-back and left-back.

Born in Renens, Switzerland to Albanian parents, Veseli began his youth career with local club FC Renens before joining Lausanne-Sport in 2005. In 2008, he was signed by English club Manchester City, before joining Manchester United in January 2012. Having failed to break into the first team, he was released in July 2013 and joined Ipswich Town, who allowed him to go on loan to Bury in the second half of the 2013–14 season. He was loaned out to Port Vale for the first half of the 2014–15 season, before joining permanently in January 2015. He returned to Switzerland in July 2015 and joined Lugano, and featured on the losing side in the 2016 Swiss Cup final before he signed with Italian side Empoli in August 2016. He served Empoli as vice-captain as the club secured promotion as champions of Serie B in the 2017–18 campaign. He joined French club Le Mans on loan in January 2020 and then signed with Salernitana eight months later. He helped Salernitana to win promotion out of Serie B at the end of the 2020–21 season. He signed with Benevento in August 2022.

He represented Switzerland at every level of youth football, and captained the Switzerland under-17s to victory in the 2009 FIFA U-17 World Cup. After refusing call-ups from Kosovo, in November 2015 he accepted the Albania national team's invitation to continue his international career, and was named in the squad for UEFA Euro 2016.

Early and personal life
Veseli was born in Switzerland to Albanian parents from Kosovo and speaks fluent English, French, Albanian and Italian. His father settled the family in Lausanne and worked in construction before joining a multi-national company that made plastic packaging. Veseli achieved the top grades in his school's region at the age of 15. In 2022, he was living with his partner, an accountant from Switzerland.

Club career

Early career
Veseli started his football career with Renens. In 2005, he joined Lausanne-Sport, where he remained until 2008, when he moved to England to join Manchester City's Elite Development Squad. He would spend the next four seasons playing primarily for the reserve team. During the 2010–11 season, manager Roberto Mancini named Veseli in the first team squad for the League Cup Third round match against West Bromwich Albion on 22 September, where he was an unused substitute for the entire game. Mancini promised to give him his Premier League debut on the final day of the 2010–11 season, but Veseli tore his hamstring and was unable to play. Prior to the 2011–12 season, Veseli featured prominently at the 2011 World Football Challenge but did not make any first-team appearance that year. He demanded a contract of £5,000-a-week, which City refused to give, and he was approached by René Meulensteen, a coach under Alex Ferguson at City's local rivals Manchester United. Brian Marwood had wanted to demonstrate to the City players that the City Football Group could not be forced into offering more generous terms than they were willing to give.

On 31 January 2012, the last day of the 2012 winter transfer window, Veseli joined Manchester United on a free transfer. However he failed to break into the first-team at Old Trafford and Manchester United released Veseli at the end of his contract in July 2013.

Ipswich Town
In July 2013, Veseli was signed by Mick McCarthy's Championship club Ipswich Town on a two-year deal. On 6 August, Veseli made his professional debut in a 2–0 League Cup defeat by Stevenage at Broadhall Way. However he was unsuited to McCarthy's long ball style of play.

On 31 December 2013, Veseli had signed a one-month loan deal for struggling League Two side Bury. His loan spell at Gigg Lane was later extended by a further month before finally being extended to the full 93-day period. He started 18 league games for the club and was influential in their rise from 20th in the table and fighting relegation up to 11th, when he left, after new manager David Flitcroft decided to include Veseli in a back three alongside Pablo Mills and Jimmy McNulty. In his 18 appearances the "Shakers" kept ten clean sheets.

Port Vale
In July 2014, Veseli signed on loan for League One side Port Vale for the first half of the 2014–15 season, with manager Micky Adams intending him to provide first team competition for right-back Adam Yates. He missed two weeks after breaking his ribs in September. He returned to the starting eleven at centre back on 15 November, helping the "Valiants" to a 1–0 win over Rochdale at Vale Park. He was picked out as the star player in the following week's 1–0 defeat to Milton Keynes Dons. He joined Port Vale on a permanent basis on 7 January 2015, after being released by Ipswich. On 21 February, he scored his first goal in professional football with a speculative effort from 30-yards in a 3–0 home win over Doncaster Rovers. The goal helped him to be named in the English Football League team of the week. He was offered a new contract of £1,000-a-week, but turned it down.

Lugano
In July 2015, Veseli rejected a contract offer from Port Vale and instead signed a 12-month deal with Swiss Super League side Lugano following a successful two week trial. He played 33 of the club's 36 league games in the 2015–16 season, as Lugano avoided relegation by finishing just one point above bottom club FC Zürich. Lugano also reached the final of the Swiss Cup at Letzigrund, where Veseli was sent off in stoppage time after receiving two yellow cards in a 1–0 defeat to Zürich. He rejected the club's contract offer of 7,000-Swiss francs-a-month and the club unsuccessfully sued him, which prevented him from playing professional football until October 2016.

Empoli
Vesli signed a two-year contract with Serie A club Empoli in August 2016. He played 17 games for the "Azzurri", but was an unused substitute on the last day of the 2016–17 as Empoli were relegated with a 2–1 defeat at Palermo.

Following the club's relegation, Veseli was one of only three survivors of a cull to the playing squad, and was named as a vice-captain. On 25 August 2017, he renewed his contract with Empoli until 30 June 2021. He made 30 appearances across the 2017–18 campaign as Empoli made an immediate return to the top-flight a champions of Serie B under the stewardship of Aurelio Andreazzoli. He then featured 31 times in Serie A during the 2018–19 campaign as Empoli were relegated on the final day of the season.

On 31 January 2020, he joined French Ligue 2 club Le Mans on loan. The 2019–20 Ligue 2 season was suspended indefinitely on 12 March and was eventually abandoned due to the COVID-19 pandemic in France.

Salernitana
On 26 August 2020, he signed a two-year contract with Serie B club Salernitana. He played 23 league games in the 2020–21 season, scoring one goal, as Fabrizio Castori's Salernitana secured promotion into Serie A with a second-place finish in Serie B. However it was a difficult season on a personal level as he injured his knee, his calf, fractured his ankle and contracted COVID-19 over the course of the campaign. He played nine games during as Salernitana managed to avoid relegation in the 2021–22 season, with all but one of his appearances coming under Stefano Colantuono, who succeeded Castori as head coach in October only to be replaced by Davide Nicola in February.

Benevento
On 27 August 2022, Veseli moved to Benevento in Serie B.

International career
In May 2009, Veseli reached the semi-finals of the UEFA European Under-17 Championship, which was held in Germany. In October 2009, he competed in the FIFA U-17 World Cup, which was held in Nigeria, playing in six matches and eventually winning the competition as captain with a 1–0 victory over the hosts at the Abuja Stadium.

Although he has Swiss citizenship, Veseli declared to the media that he would welcome a call-up from Albania, given his Albanian ethnicity. He had also been contacted several times by Kosovo coach Albert Bunjaki, but refused to commit himself to Kosovo.

Albania
On 7 November 2015, Veseli received his first call up to Albania by coach Gianni De Biasi for the friendly matches against Kosovo and Georgia on 13 and 16 November 2015. He made his first appearance against Kosovo as a substitute in the 63rd minute for Berat Djimsiti.

Euro 2016
On 21 May 2016, Veseli was named in Albania's preliminary 27-man squad for UEFA Euro 2016, and in Albania's final 23-man UEFA Euro 2016 squad on 31 May. He appeared as an 86th-minute substitute against hosts France in Albania's second group game, which ended in a 2–0 defeat. Albania finished the group in the third position with three points and with a goal difference –2, and was ranked last in the third-placed teams, which eventually eliminated them.

Style of play
Speaking in July 2014, Port Vale manager Micky Adams stated that Veseli was "quick, he can handle the ball and he's got decent pedigree".

Career statistics

Club

International

Honours
Lugano
Swiss Cup runner-up: 2015–16

Empoli
Serie B: 2017–18

Salernitana
Serie B second-place promotion: 2020–21

Switzerland U17
FIFA U-17 World Cup: 2009

References

External links

 Frederic Veseli – Euro 2016 profile at FSHF.org

1992 births
Living people
Sportspeople from the canton of Vaud
Swiss people of Kosovan descent
Swiss people of Albanian descent
Association football defenders
Swiss men's footballers
Switzerland youth international footballers
Switzerland under-21 international footballers
Albanian footballers
Albania international footballers
UEFA Euro 2016 players
Manchester City F.C. players
Manchester United F.C. players
Ipswich Town F.C. players
Bury F.C. players
Port Vale F.C. players
FC Lugano players
Empoli F.C. players
Le Mans FC players
U.S. Salernitana 1919 players
Benevento Calcio players
English Football League players
Swiss Super League players
Serie A players
Serie B players
Ligue 2 players
Swiss expatriate footballers
Albanian expatriate footballers
Swiss expatriate sportspeople in England
Albanian expatriate sportspeople in England
Expatriate footballers in England
Swiss expatriate sportspeople in Italy
Albanian expatriate sportspeople in Italy
Expatriate footballers in Italy
Swiss expatriate sportspeople in France
Albanian expatriate sportspeople in France
Expatriate footballers in France